Alessandro Cesarini (died 13 February 1542), bishop of Pistoia, was an Italian cardinal of the Roman Catholic Church.

Life

Born in Rome, the son of Agabito Cesarini, he became close to the Medici family, particularly Cardinal Giovanni di Lorenzo de' Medici, the future Pope Leo X. He was made cardinal deacon on 1 July 1517 and received the deaconry of Sts. Sergius and Bacchus, opting for the deaconry of Santa Maria in Via Lata in 1523. He became known for his patronage of writers and artists.

He served as apostolic administrator of Pamplona, Spain from 1520 to 1538; that of Alessano, Italy from 1526 to 1531; that of Otranto, Italy from 1526 to 1536; that of Gerace, Italy from 1536 to 1538; that of Catanzaro, Italy briefly in 1536; that of Oppido Mamertina, Italy from 1536 to 1538 (resigning in favor of his natural son, Ascanio Cesarini, who succeeded him in that see from 1538 to 1542); that of Jaën from 6 July 1537 to 14 June 1538; and that of Cuenca, Spain from 1538 to his death.

In the sack of Rome by mutinous troops of Charles V in 1527, he was one of the cardinals held hostage.

He participated in the conclave of 1521–1522, which elected Adrian VI; of 1523, which elected Clement VII; and of 1534, which elected Paul III.

He became cardinal bishop and chose the suburbicarian see of Albano, Italy in 1540.

He was appointed bishop of Palestrina, Italy in 1541, in which office he died on 13 February 1542 in Rome. He was buried in his family’s tomb in the church of Santa Maria in Aracoeli in Rome.

References

16th-century Italian cardinals
1542 deaths
Year of birth unknown
16th-century Italian Roman Catholic bishops
Clergy from Rome